Strymonas is a former municipality in the Serres regional unit, Greece. Since the 2011 local government reform it is part of the municipality Emmanouil Pappas, of which it is a municipal unit. It is named after the river Strymonas. The municipal unit has an area of 120.383 km2. Population 6,546 (2011). The seat of the municipality was in Neos Skopos.

References

Populated places in Serres (regional unit)

bg:Струма (дем)